Dr. Buddha Dhan Chakma is an Indian politician representing Tuichawng in the Mizoram Legislative Assembly. Formerly a Congress member, he is the first candidate of the BJP to win a seat for the party in the state.

Earlier, Dr. Chakma served as the fifteenth Chief Executive Member of Chakma Autonomous District Council.

Facebook Page:

References

External links
 https://myneta.info/mizoram2018/candidate.php?candidate_id=349

Bharatiya Janata Party politicians from Mizoram
Chakma people
Indian Buddhists
Living people
Mizoram MLAs 2013–2018
Mizoram MLAs 2018–2023
1973 births
People from Mizoram